Vibe Tribe is the music project of Russian-born Israeli producers Stas Marnyanski (born 23 March 1985 - died 30 October 2022) and (formerly) Elmar Ivatarov.

Stas has been producing electronic-based music since 13 years of age. After four years of experimentation and thorough learning, he kick-started his professional career, and began publishing tracks on various compilation releases.

His debut album Melodrama was released 2004, and his second studio album, Wise Cracks, in 2006.

Vibe Tribe's tracks have been featured on compilations released under labels, including Utopia Records, Neurobiotic Records, Shiva Space Technology, Turbo Trance Records, BNE Records, Crystal Matrix, Spun Records, Noga Records, and others.

Vibe Tribe's remix of Infected Mushroom's track "Shakawkaw" was released as a bonus track on the LP version of the Infected Mushroom best-selling album Converting Vegetarians (YoYo Records 2004). The production of his third featured studio album release was completed in 2011.

According to his friends and acquaintances, Stas died on October 30, 2022, as a result of a heart attack at the age of only 37.

Discography
 Melodrama (2004)
 Wise Cracks (2006)
 Destination Unknown (2009)
 Urban Legend (2011)

External links
Official website
Vibe Tribe at Discogs
Vibe Tribe at MySpace
Vibe Tribe interview at Psychedelic Magazine

References

Israeli psychedelic trance musicians
Remixers
Musical groups established in 2002
2002 establishments in Israel